Sascha Braunig (born 1983) is a Canadian painter. Her paintings have been variously described as hyperrealist and surrealist.

Braunig was born in Qualicum Beach, British Columbia and lives and works in Portland, Maine.

Braunig was included in the 2014 Thames and Hudson book 100 Painters of Tomorrow . In 2015 she took part in the New Museum triennial exhibition titled Surround Audience. She has had solo exhibitions at MoMA PS1, New York and at Norway's Kunsthall Stavanger. Her work is included in the collection of the National Gallery of Victoria, Melbourne, Australia, among others.

References

1983 births
21st-century Canadian women artists
21st-century Canadian painters
Artists from British Columbia
People from the Regional District of Nanaimo
Artists from Portland, Oregon
Living people